Title Nine or Title IX may refer to:

Legal
 Title IX - U.S. federal law prohibiting sex discrimination in federally-funded education programs
 Title IX of the Civil Rights Act of 1964 - law making it easier to move civil rights cases from U.S. state courts to federal court
 Title 9 of the United States Code - the role of arbitration in the United States Code

Business
 Title Nine Sports - American sports apparel brand